The Jean E. Coleman Library Outreach Lecture presented at the annual conference of the American Library Association is tribute to the work of Jean E. Coleman to ensure that all citizens, particularly Native Americans and adult learners, have access to quality library services. Dr. Coleman directed the American Library Association, Office for Literacy and Outreach Services (OLOS) which served the Association by identifying and promoting library services that support equitable access to the knowledge and information stored in our libraries. OLOS focused attention on services that are inclusive of traditionally underserved populations, including new and non-readers, people geographically isolated, people with disabilities, rural and urban poor people, and people generally discriminated against based on race, ethnicity, sexual orientation, gender identification, age, language and social class. The Jean E. Coleman lecture is now sponsored by the Office for Diversity, Literacy and Outreach Services (ODLOS).

Jean E. Coleman 

The Jean E. Coleman Library Outreach Lecture series is an opportunity for library workers to learn more about their roles in providing equity of access. The Social Responsibilities Round Table Action Council of the American Library Association approved the following testimonial to the work of African American librarian Jean Coleman in outreach during her work from 1973 to 1986 for the ALA Office for Library Outreach Services (now Office for Literacy and Outreach Services: OLOS):

Jean Coleman . . . was outstanding in her willingness to listen to the members of the groups she worked with and to make their wishes effective, translating ideas into action and program, unlike the model of the staff who organizes the agenda and steers the meetings in a controlled setting.

She offered her services especially warmly to the minority librarians and those from small libraries, and did not play a career-promoting role of special services for the powerful. She therefore fully represented the original concerns of ALA in proposing the many outreach organizations and diverse programs under the OLOS umbrella.

She is especially missed by those who found in her the education to become competent officers and received from her the support to make their groups effective.

So important were her contributions to the world of diversity in librarianship, that in 1999 it was noted that the Smithsonian Institution accepted two items for its collection from Coleman's estate, including two Apache toy cradle boards, and a sand painting.

Legacy 

For background on the development of outreach services in U.S. libraries  The evolution of library outreach 1960-75 provides historical background in the context of the War on Poverty. Jean Coleman's legacy is the evolving mission of the Office of Literacy and Outreach Services. This also includes the ideals of equity of access. Carla Hayden took equity of access as her theme when she was American Library Association president (2003–04). A book written during Hayden's presidency, From outreach to equity: Innovative models of library policy and practice includes an introduction coauthored by Satia Marshall Orange (director, OLOS, 1997-2009). The book suggests reframing`outreach based on equity rather than underserved populations. Another project highlighting the work of OLOS initiated by President Hayden was the report,  Rocks in the Whirlpool: Equity of Access and the American Library Association which examines unifying visions for equity of access and making new technologies work for human development.
Satia Marshall Orange, 2019 lecturer,  gave a history of the series in her presentation, "Backstories: Reflections of the Jean E. Coleman Library Outreach Lecture: 2000-2019."

Lecture Series 
2022: Jeanie Austin, Jail and reentry services librarian at the San Francisco Public Library. Author of Library Services and Incarceration.  "Creativity, Learning and Free Expression in Carceral Contexts." The lecture included panelists Nicole Shawan Junior, Deputy Director of PEN America Prison and Justice Writing and Kurtis Tanaka, program manager for justice initiatives at Ithaka S+R.
2021. Aaron LaFromboise, Director of Library Services at Medicine Spring Library, the academic library for Blackfeet Community College and the community library/archives for the Blackfeet Nation. "Mirroring Community in the Library: Growing momentum for Tribal libraries and Tribal librarianship."
 2020: rescheduled.
 2019: Satia Marshall Orange, director of American Library Association Office for Literacy and Outreach (OLOS) now the Office for Diversity, Literacy and Outreach Services. (ODLOS) under Orange’s passionate leadership and advocacy, OLOS broadened the association's support and celebration of traditionally underserved library staff and library communities, developed new ALA member units, and increased participation in events and activities, including the initiation of the annual Dr. Martin Luther King Jr. Sunrise Celebration, Joint Conference for Librarians of Color (JCLC), and Bookmobile Day at ALA Annual. Through these initiatives and cooperation from ALA members and affiliates, Orange was able to increase member engagement across ALA. Lecture: "Backstories: Reflections of the Jean E. Coleman Library Outreach Lecture: 2000-2019." In 2022 ALA established an endowment honoring Orange.
 2018: No lecture.
 2017:Janice Rice, retired Outreach Coordinator at the University of Wisconsin-Madison Libraries. 
 2016: Andrew P. Jackson (Sekou Molefi Baako),director emeritus of Queens Library Langston Hughes Community and Cultural Center.
 2015: Carla D. Hayden  CEO, Enoch Pratt Free Library in Baltimore, in recognition of her efforts to keep the Library and its branches open and continually engaged with the community during the civil unrest in the wake of the death of Freddie Gray in April, 2015. Dr. Hayden was President of the American Library Association in 2003-2004. She was named Librarian of Congress in 2016.
 2014: Virginia Bradley Moore: Moore, an ALA member since 1972, was an important factor in the creation of the Martin Luther King Jr. Sunrise Celebration. In 2013 she was awarded the Distinguished Service to the Library Profession Award from the Black Caucus of the American Library Association.
 2013: Loriene Roy: Roy was the 2007-08 President of the ALA. Her focus as president was supporting literacy, promoting LIS education through an emphasis on practice, and establishing programs for workplace wellness.
 2012: Carol A. Brey-Casiano: Brey-Casiano was director of libraries for El Paso, Texas and president of the ALA. She has worked in the fields of library advocacy and outreach services, notably Spanish speaking patrons. 
 2011: Robert Wedgeworth: Wedgeworth’s career in librarianship includes his helping to craft the Copyright Revision Law of 1978, his serving as Dean of the School of Library Science at Columbia University, and his being Executive Director of the ALA, where one of his priorities was promoting adult literacy.
 2010: Kathleen de la Peña McCook: McCook is Distinguished University Professor, at the University of South Florida, School of Information. Her writing emphasizes social justice and human rights. She is the author of Introduction to Public Librarianship.
 2009: Kathleen Mayo: Mayo has spent over 30 years working in library outreach and special services. As a consultant to the State Library and Archives of Florida, she helped to improve library programs for Florida's correctional, mental health, and developmental disabilities services. The challenges and opportunities of serving America’s elders.
 2008: Clara Chu: Chu is a proponent of multicultural librarianship and is author of "Raison d'être for Multicultural Library Services." She earned the 2002 ALA Equity Award and named a 2005 Library Journal Mover & Shaker. Dislocations of multicultural librarianship: A critical examination for a liberatory practice.
 2007: Anne Moore, then Associate Director at University of Massachusetts-Amherst and now Dean of Library Affairs at Southern Illinois University and Stephen E. Stratton, Librarian at J.S. Broome Library, California State University, were among the speakers.
 2006: Carla Hayden: Hayden is CEO of Enoch Pratt Free Library in Baltimore, was president of the ALA, where she fought to safeguard library patron’s privacies and was a strong critic of the newly passed United States Patriot Act. She was named Library Journal's National Librarian of the Year in 1995.
 2005: Sanford Berman: Berman has sought to correct what he sees as biased headings in the Library of Congress Subject Headings. He worked to ensure libraries work more with the poor and homeless and founded the ALA's Hunger, Homeless and Poverty Task Force. Carla Hayden
 2004: Richard Chabrán: Chabrán works to help narrow the digital divide in regards to schools and libraries in California. He has sought to promote multicultural librarianship and assists libraries in serving low-income and underserved communities and has been a Distinguished Librarian at the University of California, Riverside. Answering the call: How the FCC's definition of information service threatens the future of universal service.
 2003: Thelma H. Tate: Tate has been involved in helping libraries implement outreach services. She is a well-recognized author in the subjects of librarianship and information technology, served chaired several standing committees for the ALA, and has been a leader for the Chicago Public Library and Rutgers University. Unserved and underserved populations: Empowering people for productivity in the 21st Century.
 2002: Lotsee Patterson: Patterson is a founder of the American Indian Library Association and is dedicated to developing tribal libraries for Native American communities. She works to recruit and train Native Americans in librarianship. For this and other endeavors she was awarded the American Library Association's Equity Award in 1994. Lotsee Patterson.
 2001: Gary E. Strong: Strong has been a library director for three separate libraries, most recently for Queens Borough Public Library, a State Librarian for California, and a University Librarian for UCLA. The topic for his lecture was on the importance of reading for children.
 2000: Barbara J. Ford: Ford was ALA President in 1997-98 and she spoke about improving library outreach to underserved populations in part by utilizing new technologies in reaching these communities. Libraries, literacy, outreach and the digital divide.

References

External links
Jean E. Coleman Library Outreach Lecture American Library Association
 Office for Diversity, Literacy and Outreach Services.

Coleman, Jean E
American Library Association
Poverty in the United States
American librarianship and human rights
Library history
American Library Association awards